Pink Lady is a South Korean webtoon on WEBTOON by Yeon Woo (연우) and Seo Na (서나). It describes a love life of two artists who share a past memory of childhood love.

Its popularity caused it to be adapted to published comics by JoongAng Books.

The author, Yeon Woo and Seo Na, are college students affiliated to Hongik University, the most famous art university in South Korea, and the one that the protagonists go to. The comic often gives information on real-life artists, their drawings, methods of drawings and other real information.

The manhwa often states the authors' belief that the best drawing that can be produced by an artist is one the artist drew with his/her heart, out of the desire of the heart, and with the true love for the subject.

At various points, the manhwa parodies famous paintings. For example, the scene in which Gyeo-Wul relishes the thought of earning money from Bo-Gyeong is a parody of Michelangelo's The Creation of Adam.

Seasons
Season 1 (02/05/2007~30/07/2007): Describes Gyeo-Wul's life till the graduation and reveals the past relationship of Gyeo-Wul and Hyeon-Seok.

Season 2 (20/08/2007~10/12/2007): Describes Gyeo-Wul's efforts to get employed and Hyeon-Seok slowly warming up to her, and their relationship being closer and closer. The season culminates in Gyeo-Wul finally realizing that Hyeon-Seok deeply loves her, despite how he expresses his emotions.

Season 3 (07/01/2008~07/04/2008): Describes Hyeon-Seok and Gyeo-Wul's new school life and focuses on the four intertwined lovers. Also throws light on the historical artist couples all ending up tragically, and hints that Gyeo-Wul and Hyeon-Seok might end up the same way.

Season 4 (05/05/2008~04/08/2008): Describes the relationship between Gyeo-Wul and Hyeon-Seok becoming more ominous and uneasy, hinting possible tragedy.

Season 5 (01/09/2008~23/02/2009): Describes the two couples sharing a strong bond, and finally being drawn together, and thus completing the series.

After the completion of each season, the author was (very infamously) known to have rested for nearly a month, very much to the annoyance of the fans who entered the site anticipating the next chapter, only to find an epilogue instead.

Characters

Han Gyeo-Wul (한겨울)

A 23-year-old girl who has freshly graduated from a renowned art college. Her first name Gyeo-Wul means 'winter' (and is not a homophone, as there is no Chinese character that is pronounced as 'gyeo' in Korean) and combined with her last name, her name means 'the middle of the winter'. She is exceptionally short for her age (about 150 cm or 5 ft) and looks younger than she is, although upon closer observation she does resemble her age. The title Pink Lady is named after her; most likely to be a reference to her usually wearing pink clothing.

Yun Hyeon-Seok (윤현석)
A 23-year-old post-graduate at Gyeo-Wul's college. He works part-time in a pub named EVA.

Carnille Claudel / Bo-Gyeong (보경)
A cousin of Hyeon-Seok (evidenced by her referring to Hyeon-Seok's father as her uncle) and another very good artist. She has brownish-golden hair and seems to be a daughter of two people from different nations, one of which is obviously South Korea and the other likely to be European. Her business card reveals her official name as Carnille Claudel, a foreign name to Koreans (proving that her mother is Korean and her father from another nation), and the name Bo-Gyeong is her Korean name and the one that Hyeon-Seok and her all other Korean relatives call her.

Kim Seon-Il (김선일)
A 19-year-old boy in love with Gyeo-Wul. He was a student of Gyeo-Wul three years prior to the beginning of the series at which time he was noticeably fatter than now. Now he is a handsome slim boy with a messy hair and a habit of smoking.

Sim Young-Bo (심영보)
A 19-year-old girl and a friend of Seon-Il. She loves him, but this is unnoticed, and unrequited. She is also a student at the same college as Gyeo-Wul, Hyeon-Seok and Seon-Il.

Music video
Two music videos of the comic were created and is free to be accessed in the links below. Each contains the story of one of the two seasons completed to date.

The first one, dubbed "You, You At Least (그대는 그대만은)" by To Romance (투로맨스) describes the story of the first season and the story of the childhood age of Gyeo-Wul and Hyeon-Seok, and has a music of the same name as its background music.

The second video, titled "Spring After Winter (겨울 지나 봄)" by Soo Jung (수정), was released on 10 March 2008, and also gained immediate attention. It features the music of same title and show the story of the last part of Season 2. It showed a scene that the original toon did not: a scene in which Hyeon-Seok bends and kisses Gyeo-Wul.

External links
Official website on Naver Webtoon

Romance comics
Manhwa titles
Naver Comics titles
2009 comics endings
2000s webtoons
South Korean webtoons
Webtoons in print
Romance webtoons
2007 webtoon debuts